Martin Andrew Taylor is an Operating Principal at Vista Equity Partners, as well as the President of Vista Consulting Group. He was the former senior executive Corporate Vice President of Windows Live and MSN at Microsoft, acting as Steve Ballmer’s Chief of Staff for many years.

Life
He attended George Mason University as an Economics major in Fairfax, Virginia.

Microsoft
Taylor joined Microsoft in 1993 and rose to head of its Caribbean subsidiary. During this period, Taylor worked closely on several occasions with Steve Ballmer. In 2002, Taylor was hired as Ballmer’s chief of staff. Later, he was named  director of business strategy and contributed to the reorganization of Microsoft into seven business groups.
 
In 2003, he became head of the team to steer Microsoft's David-and-Goliath battle against Linux. He spent the next several years  helping redevelop Microsoft Windows software to better compete with Linux. His work to start a marketing campaign called “Get the Facts”. The campaign mainly focused on cost of ownership, but later included security, reliability, and interoperability.

In March 2006, he was hired as   corporate vice president of Windows Live and MSN marketing, and  oversaw the creation of Windows Live Messenger (formally MSN Messenger) and the testing of over 20 new Windows Live services.

In June 2006, just few months after the first official announcement of Windows Live and only days before the release of Windows Live Messenger 8.0, Microsoft announced they were "parting ways" with Taylor.

Vista Partners
In December 2006,  Taylor joined Vista Equity Partners.

References

Living people
American computer businesspeople
Microsoft employees
American Internet celebrities
George Mason University alumni
History of Microsoft
Microsoft Windows people
People from Redmond, Washington
Year of birth missing (living people)